The 1998–99 FHR season was the first and only season of the league, organized by the Russian Ice Hockey Federation. It existed alongside the Vysshaya Liga as the second level of ice hockey in Russia in 1998–99. 17 teams participated in the league, and Nosta Yuzhny Novotroitsk-Orsk won the championship.

First round

Western Conference

Eastern Conference

Final round

Placing round (Eastern Conference)

External links 
 Season on hockeyarchives.info]

2